Tomás Guido. (November 1, 1788, Buenos Aires–September 14, 1866) was a general in the Argentine War of Independence, a diplomat and a politician.

Early life

Tomás Guido was the son of a Spanish merchant Pedro Guido y Sanz and his wife Juana Aoiz y Martínez. He attended San Carlos College, but was forced to give up his studies by an economic crisis.

Guido saw his first military action in 1806 when he helped to defend Buenos Aires from the British invaders. He later went on to participate in the May Revolution in 1810.

In 1811 Guido became the secretary for Dr Mariano Moreno on his journey to England. In 1812 Guido returned to Argentina to work as a secretary in the Ministry of War, later he moved to Charcas to work as a secretary for Francisco Ortiz de Ocampo. Later he travelled to Tucumán where he joined José de San Martín y Manuel Belgrano, where he worked as the chief Secretary of the Army, working with San Martín to plan the campaign to liberate Chile and Peru.

On May 20, 1816 Guido presented Antonio González Balcarce with Memoria, which was based on his memories of conversations with San Martín in Saldán, Córdoba about the military, economic and political details of the Maitland Plan.

Campaign of liberation in Chile and Peru

After the victory at the Battle of Chacabuco (February 12, 1817). General San Martín named Guido as Lieutenant Colonel, but he continued doing the job of Chief Secretary of the Army and Navy. During the ceremony to mark the official declaration of Chilean independence on February 12, 1818, Guido played the role of flagbearer.

Guido then worked as a diplomat for San Martín during the effort to liberate Peru, he negotiated with the Spanish Viceroy at Miraflores before San Martín declared Peruvian Independence on July 28, 1821. Guido was at the Guayaquil Conference where the two great Liberators of South America (San Martín and Simón Bolívar) met for the only time. After San Martín left Peru, Guido stayed on, earning the titles of Supreme Military Advisor in 1823 and later Brigadier General.

Return to Argentina

In 1826 Guido returned to Buenos Aires where he was appointed as Inspector of Arms in 1827 by Bernardino Rivadavia. He later served as Minister of War and Foreign Relations on three occasions with Lavalle, Viamonte and Rosas.

Between 1840 and 1851 Guido was Argentina's representative to the government of Brazil.

Death

Guido died on December 14, 1866 in Buenos Aires, leaving his wife and four children.

External links
 Tomás Guido 
 

1788 births
1866 deaths
People from Buenos Aires
Argentine diplomats
Government ministers of Argentina
Foreign ministers of Argentina
Ambassadors of Argentina to Chile
Burials at Buenos Aires Metropolitan Cathedral
People of the Argentine War of Independence
Federales (Argentina)